San Andros Airport  is an airport near Nicholls Town on Andros Island in The Bahamas.

Facilities

The airport has services from Westernair, Bahamasair, Lynx (from Fort Lauderdale) and other small twin engine charter planes that run between the islands.

Since November 2006, the airport has Av Gas and Jet A available from Westernair. The newly built Western Executive Jet Center has big screen TV, executive style bathrooms, conference rooms, pilot lounges, passenger area, delicatessen, and a VIP lounge. They also have a maintenance hangar for their aircraft and executive planes and a terminal for domestic flights.

Airlines and destinations
Scheduled passenger service from this airport is provided by the following airlines:

References

External links
 Westernair, official site
 
 

Airports in the Bahamas
Andros, Bahamas